Ophidiella is a subgenus of the genus Plasmodium created in 1966 by Garnham.

It was created as a subgenus for the then only known species infecting snakes - Plasmodium wenyoni.

Species 
Plasmodium pessoai
Plasmodium tomodoni
Plasmodium wenyoni

References 

Plasmodium subgenera